A strip search is a practice of searching a person for weapons or other contraband suspected of being hidden on their body or inside their clothing, and not found by performing a frisk search, but by requiring the person to remove some or all clothing. The search may involve an official performing an intimate person search and inspecting their personal effects and body cavities (mouth, vagina, rectum, etc.). A strip search is more intrusive than a frisk and requires legal authority. Regulations covering strip searches vary considerably and may be mandatory in some situations or discretionary in others.

Legality of strip searches
In North America, civil lawsuits, as well as criminal code charges against strip searches have usually been successful when a person is strip searched by someone of the opposite sex, especially in cases where a woman has been strip searched by a male guard or guards.  The more disputed legal cases have often involved the presence of people of the other gender during a strip search.  Some of these cases have been less successful because of the legal technicality of who was actually performing the strip search, i.e. if more than one guard is present, the search is often (legally) said to be performed by the person or people giving the orders or instructions to the person or people being searched.

Another legal issue is that of blanket strip searches, such as in jails where detainees are routinely strip searched prior to conviction of a crime. Courts have often held that blanket strip searches are acceptable only for convicted persons.  For detainees pending trial, there must be a reasonable suspicion that the detainee is in possession of weapons or other contraband before a strip search can be conducted.  The same often holds true for other situations such as airport security personnel and customs officers, but the dispute often hinges on what constitutes reasonable suspicion.

Incidental strip searches
In order to bypass the legal reasonable suspicion requirement, and because strip searches can be humiliating, the search is often made less overt, as part of an intake process, that includes a mandatory shower.  For example, most prisons also include a mandatory shower along with a change of clothes.  The shower serves to make the strip search less blatant as well as providing the additional benefit of removing contamination (in addition to removing weapons or other contraband).  Many shelters require new arrivals to hand over all their clothing for a wash, as well as requiring them to have a shower. These rules also enable a discreet check for weapons or other contraband,  with less legal implications, being less objectionable because the requirement is applied to everyone entering a facility. It is less offensive to clients than requiring them to undergo an overt strip search.

Security procedures at facilities that mine and process gold, silver, copper, and other high-value minerals may constitute an incidental strip search. At the end of the workday, miners must remove all work clothes before entering a shower facility and then exit nude through a metal detector to a separate changing room where street clothes are stored.

The courts have often held that requiring a person to have a shower as a condition of entry into a space (such as a prison, shelter, or the like) does not, in itself, constitute a strip search, even if the shower and surrounding space are so constructed as to afford visibility of the unclothed body by guards during the showering process.

Hospitals often also have a mandatory shower, during lockdown, when mass decontamination is called for.  Paul Rega, M.D., FACEP has specifically identified mass decontamination as providing the added benefit of checking for weapons or other contraband, as well as searching for clues among the clothes of persons found at a terrorist attack crime scene where it is recognized that the perpetrator(s) could be among the persons detained for decontamination.

Children 

In 2014, it was reported that more than 4,600 children had been strip-searched by the Metropolitan Police in the preceding five years, with the youngest being ten years old. This was out of a total of 134,000 strip-searched. A charity described the number of younger children searched in this way as being "disturbing". In 2022, it was reported that 650 children (between 10 and 17 years old) had been strip-searched by the same agency between 2018 and 2020. 58% of these children were described as black by the arresting officer; in 2018, this rose to 75%. 70% of children who were strip-searched without an appropriate adult present – contrary to official Metropolitan Police guidance – were black boys.

Procedure of strip searches
Partial strip searches are common at airports, for airport security, which often consists of:
removal of shoes (and sometimes socks)
removal of coat and jacket
removal of belt;
untucking of shirt.

If there is reason to suspect hidden objects, the person is then taken to a private room, which consists of:
removal of shirt
removal of trousers
removal of underwear and bra

Electronic strip searches

Backscatter X-ray machines, Millimeter wave scanners, T-ray scans, and other modern technology provide the ability to see through clothing, to achieve a similar result to an actual strip search.

Notable lawsuits
The Supreme Court of Canada ruled in R v Golden (2001) that "strip-searches may only be done out of clear necessity with the permission of a supervisor and by members of the same sex."

In Florence v. Board of Chosen Freeholders (2012), the United States Supreme Court ruled that strip-searches are permitted for all arrests, including non-indictable, minor offenses.

Four male teenage students were strip searched at Ansonia High School in Ansonia, Connecticut, and sued the two teachers and principal who allegedly violated their rights.

The Beard v. Whitmore Lake School District (2005) case arose in Michigan when a student reported that $364 had been stolen from her gym bag during a physical education class. In response to the alleged theft, teachers searched the entire class of 20 boys and five girls in their respective locker rooms. Boys were required to undress down to their underwear. Similarly, girls were required to do so as well in front of each other. The alleged theft was reported to the local police who sent an officer who arrived midway through the search. Based on court records, the officer encouraged school personnel to continue the search. At the conclusion of the search, no money was found. A suit was filed by the American Civil Liberties Union of Michigan on behalf of students impacted by the search claiming Fourth Amendment rights violations against unreasonable search and seizure and the Fourteenth Amendment rights violation involving an equal protection violation. The case was ultimately ruled on by the Sixth Circuit Court of Appeals. The Sixth Circuit Court focused on several factors that made the strip search unreasonable. One, recovery of money was the primary basis for conducting the search, which did not, in the court's opinion, pose a health or safety threat. Secondly, the search did not involve one or two students but rather a large number of students who did not consent to the search. While the search was held to be unreasonable, the court stopped short of ruling that it was entirely unconstitutional based on prior law involving strip searches of students. Thirdly, school personnel had no reason to suspect any of the students individually. The court emphasized that school leaders have a real interest in maintaining an atmosphere free of theft but a search undertaken to find money serves a less weighty governmental interest than a search undertaken for items that pose a threat to the health and safety of students. Based on the court's position, clearly a search to recover money will not meet the court's expectation regarding the standards associated with a strip search.1

In Safford Unified School District v. Redding (2009), the Supreme Court held that it was unconstitutional for school employees to strip search minor students, in this case students in the Safford, Arizona Unified School District.

See also

 Don't touch my junk
 New South Wales Police Force strip search scandal
 Strip search phone call scam
 Undress code

References

Essex, N. (2005). Student Privacy Rights Involving Strip Searches. Education and the Law, 17(3), 105–110. 1

Law enforcement techniques
Nudity
Searches and seizures
Articles containing video clips